Stade d'Akébé is a Gabonese football club based in Libreville, Gabon.

External links 

Football clubs in Gabon
Football clubs in Libreville
Association football clubs established in 1983
1983 establishments in Gabon